The 1988–89 Yugoslav Cup was the 41st season of the top football knockout competition in SFR Yugoslavia, the Yugoslav Cup, also known as the "Marshal Tito Cup" (Kup Maršala Tita), since its establishment in 1946.

Calendar

First round
In the following tables winning teams are marked in bold; teams from outside top level are marked in italic script.

Second round

Quarter-finals

Semi-finals

Final

See also
1988–89 Yugoslav First League
1988–89 Yugoslav Second League

External links
1988–89 cup season details at Rec.Sport.Soccer Statistics Foundation
1989 cup final details at Rec.Sport.Soccer Statistics Foundation
Final match recording

Yugoslav Cup seasons
Cup
Yugo